The Adam Mickiewicz Institute is a government-sponsored organization funded by Poland's Ministry of Culture and National Heritage, and headquartered at ulica Mokotowska 25 (the Sugar Palace) in Warsaw.

Named after Polish national poet Adam Mickiewicz, its goal is to promote the Polish language and Polish culture abroad.  The institute operates a trilingual Polish-English-Russian portal, "Culture.pl", founded in 2001.

Activities
Besides a large number of associated poets, essayists, writers, translators, artists; literary, music, and film critics; and curators, the Institute includes Barbara Schabowska, the Director (the former were Krzysztof Olendzki and Paweł Potoroczyn), as well as three deputy directors and number of key projects and programmes managers.

In addition to the Ministry-of-Culture-sponsored Adam Mickiewicz Institute, there are Polish Cultural Institutes, sponsored by the Polish Ministry of Foreign Affairs, in over 22 major foreign cities, including Berlin, Bratislava, Budapest, Bucharest, Düsseldorf, Kyiv, Leipzig, London, Minsk, Moscow, New York City, Paris, Prague, Rome, Saint Petersburg, Sofia, Stockholm, Tel Aviv, Vienna, and Vilnius.

While the Adam Mickiewicz Institute frequently collaborates with the Polish Cultural Institutes, each institution is independent of the other and is sponsored by a different Polish government ministry.

Projects and programmes 

 Polska 100 – to mark the centenary of Poland's independence by many activities in six areas: music, design, visual arts, film, theatre, and new technologies.
 I, CULTURE Orchestra – musical project for young musicians from Poland, Armenia, Azerbaijan, Belarus, Georgia, Hungary, Moldova and Ukraine.
 Digital Culture – to support international presence of Polish digital artists (the Digital Cultures conference is among other activities on this track).
 Polska Design Programme
 Don`t Panic! We`re from Poland – promotes contemporary Polish music abroad

Gallery

Notes

External links

Official website

Organizations established in 2000
Cultural promotion organizations
Polish culture
Polish language
Organisations based in Warsaw
Adam Mickiewicz